

The White Jade River, also known by the native names Baiyu or Yurungkash, is a river in the southern Xinjiang region of China.

The head waters of the river rise in the Kunlun Mountains, in the area of Aksai Chin in Kashmir in the Togatax area. The river flows east for some 200 km and then north for another 200 km before passing through Khotan, China. In Khotan, the river has yielded white river rocks which are also known as nephrite jade. 

North of Khotan, it eventually dries up in the Taklamakan desert, its seasonal bed joined by that of the Black Jade River (Karakash River) near Koxlax (some 200 km north of Khotan), from where it continues north as the Hotan River, which flows into the Tarim River.

The river gets its name from the white jade that is often found in its alluvial deposits. The jade can also however be found in semi-shallow areas of the river..

Gallery

See also 
 List of rivers of China

Notes

References

External links 
 Khotan River formed by confluence White Jade and Black Jade Rivers, China (with image)
 Moyu-Hetian Highway (G3012) project ... - also includes construction of Yurungkash River Grand Bridge near Hetian, Xinjiang, China.

Rivers of Xinjiang
Sites along the Silk Road